The Albert Londres Prize is the highest French journalism award, named in honor of journalist Albert Londres.  Created in 1932, it was first awarded in 1933 and is considered the French equivalent of the Pulitzer Prize. Three laureates are awarded each year. The three categories are : "best reporter in the written press", "best audiovisual reporter" and "best reporting book".

History
On the death of Albert Londres, on 16 May 1932, his daughter, Florise Martinet-Londres, decided to create an award in his memory. From 1933, the Albert Londres prize is awarded every year on 16 May to a young journalist under the age of forty.

Florise Martinet-Londres died in 1975. The Albert Londres Prize is administered by the Association of Albert Londres Prize, comprising the various winners. Chaired for 21 years by Henri Amouroux, it is chaired since May 2006 by Josette Alia. The prize is awarded by a jury of 19 journalists and winners of the previous year. In 1985, under the influence of Henri de Turenne, also a director, a prize was created for the audiovisual documentary. Since then, the association has been administered by the Civil Society of Multimedia Authors (SCAM), a grouping of authors of documentaries. In 2017, a prize was created for the "best reporting book".

Laureates

Written word 
 1933: Émile Condroyer
 1934: Stéphane Faugier
 1935: Claude Blanchard
 1936: Jean Botrot
 1937: Max Massot
 1938: Jean-Gérard Fleury
 1939: Jacques Zimmermann
 1946: Marcel Picard for J'étais un correspondant de guerre - Ed. Janicot
 1947: André Blanchet for Débarquement à Haïphong - Ed. Dorian and Dominique Pado for Russie de Staline - Ed. Elvézir
 1948: Pierre Voisin, Le Figaro
 1949: Serge Bromberger, Le Figaro
 1950: Alix d'Unienville for En vol - Albin Michel
 1951: Henri de Turenne for Retour de Corée - Éditions Julliard
 1952: Georges Menant, Le Dauphiné libéré
 1953: Maurice Chanteloup, Le Figaro
 1954: Armand Gatti for Envoyé spécial dans la cage aux fauves - Éditions du Seuil
 1955: Jean Lartéguy, Paris-Presse
 1956: René Mauriès, La Dépêche du Midi
 1957: René Puissesseau, France Soir
 1958: Max Olivier-Lacamp, Le Figaro
 1959: Jean-Marc Théolleyre, Le Monde
 1960: Jacques Jacquet-Francillon, Le Figaro
 1961: Marcel Niedergang for Tempête sur le Congo - Ed. Plon
 1962: Max Clos, Le Figaro
 1963: Victor Franco for Cuba, La révolution sensuelle - Éditions Grasset
 1964: José Hanu for Quand le vent souffle en Angola - Ed. Brepols
 1965: Michel Croce-Spinelli, Sagipress
 1966: Yves Courrière, Nice Matin
 1967: Jean Bertolino, La Croix
 1968: Yves Cuau for Israël attaque - Robert Laffont
 1969: Yves-Guy Bergès, France Soir
 1970: Philippe Nourry, Le Figaro
 1971: Jean-François Delassus for Le Japon : monstre ou modèle - Hachette
 1972: Jean-Claude Guillebaud, Sud Ouest and Pierre Bois (Le Figaro)
 1973: Jean-Claude Pomonti, Le Monde
 1974: François Missen, Le Provençal
 1975: Thierry Desjardins, Le Figaro
 1976: Pierre Veilletet, Sud Ouest
 1977: François Debré for Cambodge, la révolution de la forêt - Flammarion
 1978: Christian Hoche, L'Express
 1979: Hervé Chabalier, Le Matin de Paris
 1980: Marc Kravetz, Libération
 1981: Bernard Guetta, Le Monde
 1982: Christine Clerc for Le Bonheur d'être français - Grasset
 1983: Patrick Meney, AFP
 1984: Jean-Michel Caradec'h, Paris Match
 1985: Alain Louyot, Le Point
 1986: François Hauter, Le Figaro
 1987: Jean-Paul Mari, Le Nouvel Observateur
 1988: Sorj Chalandon, Libération and Samy Ketz (AFP)

 1989: Jean Rolin for La ligne de front - Ed Quai Voltaire
 1990: Yves Harté, Sud Ouest
 1991: Patrick de Saint-Exupéry, Le Figaro
 1992: Olivier Weber, Le Point
 1993: Philippe Broussard, Le Monde
 1994: Dominique le Guilledoux, Le Monde
 1995: AFP's Moscow bureau (Jean Raffaelli, Boris Bachorz, Marielle Eudes, Paola Messana, Catherine Triomphe, Stéphane Orjollet, Sebastian Smith, Bertrand Rosenthal and Isabelle Astigarraga)
 1996: Annick Cojean, Le Monde
 1997: Caroline Puel, Libération, Le Point
 1998: Luc Le Vaillant Libération
 1999: Michel Moutot, AFP, New York
 2000: Anne Nivat Ouest-France, Libération, Chienne de guerre, Ed. Fayard
 2001: Serge Michel
 2002: Adrien Jaulmes, Le Figaro
 2003: Marion Van Renterghem, Le Monde
 2004: Christophe Ayad, Libération
 2005: Natalie Nougayrède, Le Monde
 2006: Delphine Minoui, Le Figaro
 2007: Luc Bronner, Le Monde
 2008: Benjamin Barthe, Le Monde
 2009: Sophie Bouillon, XXI
 2010: Delphine Saubaber, L'Express
 2011: Emmanuel Duparcq, AFP, Islamabad, Pakistan
 2012: Alfred de Montesquiou Paris Match
 2013: Doan Bui, Le Nouvel Observateur
 2014: Philippe Pujol, La Marseillaise.
 2015: Luc Mathieu, Libération.
 2016: Claire Meynial, Le Point.
 2017: Samuel Forey, Indépendant
 2018: Elise Vincent, Le Monde
 2019: Benoît Vitkine, Le Monde.
 2020 : Allan Kaval Le Monde
 2021 : Caroline Hayek, L’Orient-Le Jour
 2022 : Margaux Benn Le Figaro

Audiovisual

 1985: Christophe De Ponfilly and Bertrand Gallet for les Combattants de l'insolence
 1986: Philippe Rochot for his reporting about Lebanon
 1987: Frédéric Laffont for la Guerre des nerfs
 1988: Daniel Leconte for Barbie, sa deuxième vie
 1989: Denis Vincenti and Patrick Schmitt for les Enfants de la honte
 1990: Gilles de Maistre for J'ai 12 ans et je fais la guerre
 1991: Dominique Tierce, Hervé Brusini and Jean-Marie Lequertier for l'Affaire Farewell (France 2)
 1992: Lise Blanchet and Jean-Michel Destang for le Grand Shpountz (France 3, Thalassa)
 1993: Jean-Jacques Le Garrec for 5 jours dans Sarajevo (France 2, Journal de 20h)
 1994: Florence Dauchez for Rachida, lettres d'Algérie (les Films d'ici for France 3)
 1995: Marie-Monique Robin for Voleurs d'yeux (Planète, M6)
 1996: Patrick Boitet and Frédéric Tonolli for les Seigneurs de Behring (France 3)
 1997: Claude Sempère for Envoyé spécial : La Corse (France 2)
 1998: Catherine Jentile and Manuel Joachim for Chronique d'une tempête annoncée (TF1)
 1999: Christophe Weber and Nicolas Glimois for les Blanchisseuses de Magdalen (France 3, Sunset presse)
 2000: Rivoherizo Andriakoto for les Damnés de la terre (C9 Télévision, les Films du cyclope)
 2001: Danielle Arbid for Seule avec la guerre (Movimento for Arte)
 2002: Thierry and Jean-Xavier de Lestrade for la Justice des hommes (Maha productions)
 2003: Bertrand Coq and Gilles Jacquier for Naplouse (France 2)
 2004: Rithy Panh for S21, la machine de mort Khmère rouge (Arte, INA)
 2005: Grégoire Deniau and Guillaume Martin for Traversée clandestine (France 2)
 2006: Manon Loizeau and Alexis Marant for La Malédiction de naître fille (Capa for Arte, TSR and SRC)
 2007: Anne Poiret, Gwenlaouen Le Gouil and Fabrice Launay for Muttur : un crime contre l'humanitaire (France 5)
 2008: Alexis Monchovet, Stéphane Marchetti and Sébastien Mesquida for Rafah, chroniques d'une ville dans la bande de Gaza (Playprod and System TV for France 5)
 2009: Alexandre Dereims for Han, le prix de la liberté (Java films and Première nouvelle for Public Sénat)
 2010: Jean-Robert Viallet for La mise à mort du travail (France 3)
 2011: David André pour Une peine infinie, histoire d'un condamné à mort (France 2)
 2012: Audrey Gallet et Alice Odiot pour Zambie, à qui profite le cuivre ?.
 2013: Roméo Langlois pour Colombie : à balles réelles (France 24).
 2014: Julien Fouchet, Sylvain Lepetit and Taha Siddiqui for La guerre de la polio (France 2).
 2015: Delphine Deloget and Cécile Allegra for Voyage en barbarie (Public Sénat).
 2016: Sophie Nivelle-Cardinale & Étienne Huver, for Disparus, la guerre invisible de Syrie (Arte).
 2017 : Tristan Waleckx & Matthieu Rénier, pour Vincent Bolloré, un ami qui vous veut du bien ? (France 2).
 2018 : Marjolaine Grappe, Christophe Barreyre et Mathieu Cellard, pour Les hommes des Kim (Les hommes du dictateur). (Arte).

Book
 2017 : David Thomson, Les Revenants (Seuil, 2016).
 2018 : Jean-Baptiste Malet, L'Empire de l'or rouge. Enquête mondiale sur la tomate d'industrie (Fayard, 2017).

References

 Grands reportages : les quarante-trois prix Albert Londres 1946-1989, Seuil, 1989
 Jan Krauze, Stéphane Joseph, Grands reporters Prix Albert Londres : 100 reportages d'exception de 1950 à Aujourd'hui, Les arènes, 2010
 Grands reportages : les films du prix Albert Londres (1985 - 2010, 10 DVD), Editions Montparnasse, 2010

External links
Albert Londres Prize

 
French journalism awards
Awards established in 1932
1932 establishments in France